Farina is a form of milled wheat popular in the United States. It is often cooked as a hot breakfast cereal, or porridge. The word farina comes from the Latin word for  "meal" or "flour". 

Farina may also be cooked like polenta and farofa, which are made with ground corn. Farina with milk and sugar is sometimes used for making creams for layered cakes. Farina can be used as a substitute for bread crumbs in sweet and meat pies (to absorb excess water). It can also be used to prevent dough from sticking to baking surfaces via the baking process, leaving residual farina on the bottom of the final product.
 
Farina is a carbohydrate-rich food. When enriched with iron, it can be a significant source of dietary iron, especially for vegetarian diets. Popular brands offer up to 50% of the recommended daily value of iron in a single  serving. In commercially available farina, the bran and most of the germ are removed. Cream of Wheat, Malt-O-Meal, and Farina Mills are popular brand names of breakfast cereal. To augment its mild taste, popular add-ins to cooked farina include brown or granular sugar, maple syrup, honey, molasses, fruit, nuts, cinnamon, butter, grated chocolate, jams, milk, and salt.

See also
 Wheatena
 Semolina
 List of porridges

References

Breakfast cereals
Porridges
Flour
MOM Brands brands
Wheat